Toniniopsis is a genus of crustose and squamulose lichens in the family Ramalinaceae. The genus was circumscribed by Swiss lichenologist Eduard Frey in 1926, with Toniniopsis obscura designated the type and only species. The genus name of Toniniopsis is in honour of Carlo Tonini (1803–1877), who was an Italian chemist and botanist (Lichenology), who worked in Verona and was a member and President of the Academy of Agriculture. 
As a result of molecular phylogenetic studies, several species, formerly classified in genus Bacidia, have been transferred to Toniniopsis.

Species
Toniniopsis aromatica 
Toniniopsis bagliettoana 
Toniniopsis coelestina 
Toniniopsis coprodes 
Toniniopsis cretica 
Toniniopsis dissimilis 
Toniniopsis fusispora 
Toniniopsis illudens 
Toniniopsis inornata 
Toniniopsis mesoidea 
Toniniopsis obscura 
Toniniopsis separabilis 
Toniniopsis subincompta 
Toniniopsis verrucarioides

References

Ramalinaceae
Lichen genera
Lecanorales genera
Taxa described in 1926